Daoud Anum Yemoh (born May 6, 1954) is a Ghanaian journalist and politician. He was a member of the Sixth Parliament of the Fourth Republic of Ghana representing the Domeabra Obom Constituency in the Greater Accra Region on the ticket of the National Democratic Congress.

Personal life 
Yemoh is Christian. He is married with three children.

Early life and education 
Yemoh was born on May 6, 1954. He hails from  La-Accra, a town in the Greater Accra Region of Ghana. He graduated from Ghana Institute of Journalism and obtained his Bachelor of Science degree in journalism in 1981. He also attended Sofia-Bulgaria and obtained his diploma in Social Sciences from the Academy of Science and Management in 1985.

Politics 
Yemoh is a member of the National Democratic Congress (NDC). He was first elected as member of the parliament to represent  Domeabra Obom Constituency in the 2004 Ghanaian general election and assumed office in January 2005. He became a member of the Fifth Parliament after his re-election into office in January 2009. In 2012, he contested for third time on the ticket of the NDC and won.

References 

1954 births
Living people
National Democratic Congress (Ghana) politicians
Ghanaian journalists
Ghanaian Muslims
People from Greater Accra Region
Ghanaian MPs 2005–2009